Women's Slalom World Cup 1990/1991

Calendar

Final point standings

In Women's Slalom World Cup 1990/91 all results count.

Women's Slalom Team Results

bold indicate highest score - italics indicate race wins

External links
fis-ski.com

World Cup
FIS Alpine Ski World Cup slalom women's discipline titles